This is a list of Academy Awards ceremonies.

This list is current as of the 95th Academy Awards ceremony held on March 12, 2023.

Venues 

 1929: The Hollywood Roosevelt Hotel
 1930–1943: Alternated between the Ambassador Hotel and the Biltmore Hotel
 1944–1946: Grauman's Chinese Theatre
 1947–1948: Shrine Auditorium
 1949: Academy Award Theater
 1950–1960: Pantages Theatre
 1961–1968: Santa Monica Civic Auditorium
 1969–1987: Dorothy Chandler Pavilion
 1988–2001: Alternated between the Dorothy Chandler Pavilion and the Shrine Auditorium
 2002–2020: Dolby Theatre (also known as Kodak Theatre, 2002-2011; Hollywood and Highland Centre, 2012; Dolby Theatre, 2013-2020)
 2021: Union Station
 2022–present: Dolby Theatre

Networks

Ceremonies
Beginning with the 7th Academy Awards, held in February 1935, each year's awards are presented for films that were first shown during the full preceding calendar year from January 1 to December 31 in Los Angeles County, California. For the first five ceremonies, the eligibility period spanned twelve months from August 1 to July 31. For the 6th ceremony, held in 1934, the eligibility period lasted from August 1, 1932, to December 31, 1933.

When citing each ceremony, Academy conventions may either list the year(s) of its eligibility period, or the year in which the ceremony was actually held.

Multiple ceremonies hosted 

The following individuals have hosted (or co-hosted) the Academy Awards ceremony on two or more occasions.

Nominated hosts 

The following individuals have hosted (or co-hosted) the Academy Awards ceremony on the same year in which the individual was also a nominee.

See also 

 Academy Award
 List of presenters of the Academy Award for Best Picture

Notes

References

External links 

 The Academy Awards, USA at the Internet Movie Database

 
Events in Los Angeles
Lists of award ceremonies